The Seguí-class destroyer is a class of destroyers of the Argentine Navy.

Development 

Seguí was the only one still in her Korean War configuration meanwhile, Bouchard and Piedra had FRAM configurations.

After World War II, they were in a mothball state, but on 1 July 1972 and 5 May 1977, they were handed over to Argentina based on the Argentina-US Ship Loan Agreement. All ships took on minor roles during the Falklands War. Bouchard and Piedra escorted the Belgrano in 1982 and were caught off guard by the submarine attack. They were dispatched to hunt for HMS Conqueror and made ASW grenade passes, but no contacts were made. Bouchard took a torpedo hit, the third Mk 48 torpedo launched on the Belgrano, but it failed to detonate.

 was also bought by the Argentina, but was never commissioned and used as spare parts for their current ships during that time.

Ships in the class

References

Bibliography 
 

Destroyer classes
Seguí-class destroyers
Falklands War naval ships of Argentina